Myrmecia acuta is an Australian ant which belongs to the genus Myrmecia, and is endemic to Australia, usually found in Western Australia and some areas of South Australia. Myrmecia acuta was first described in 1991.

References

Myrmeciinae
Hymenoptera of Australia
Insects described in 1991
Insects of Australia